Fernando Vázquez Pena (born 24 October 1954) is a Spanish retired footballer who played as a central midfielder, currently a manager.

Managerial career
Born in the village of Castrofeito, O Pino, Galicia, Vázquez was an English teacher in Lalín where he began to get involved with the school's athletics, especially football. He started his senior coaching career with modest CD Lalín in 1986, but left for higher-profile Racing de Ferrol in 1991.

Vázquez took over for various clubs from 1994 to 2004, most of them in La Liga. With RC Celta de Vigo he achieved promotion followed by straight qualification to the UEFA Cup, after a sixth place in the 2005–06 season.

Vázquez was relieved of his duties as manager of Celta on 9 April 2007, on the eve of the Galician derby against Deportivo de La Coruña, with his side embroiled deep in a relegation fight which it eventually lost on the last matchday.

Aside from coaching, Vázquez also worked as a pundit for Canal+ in their UEFA Champions League coverage. While still at Celta, he took charge of the Galicia autonomous team together with Arsenio Iglesias, longtime Depor manager.

On 11 February 2013, after nearly six years away from club duty, Vázquez was appointed at Deportivo, taking Domingos Paciência's place as the third manager of the campaign as the team ranked in 20th and last position. They eventually finished one place up, but still dropped down to Segunda División.

Vázquez remained at the helm in an immediate promotion after finishing as runners-up and, on 1 June 2014, he renewed his contract until 2016. However, in July, after some statements in which he criticised the club's signing policy, he was relieved of his duties.

On 19 January 2016, after nearly 18 months of inactivity, Vázquez was appointed RCD Mallorca manager. Seriously threatened with relegation, he managed to avoid the drop in the last matchday.

Vázquez was sacked on 6 December 2016, after only one win in six matches. On 29 December 2019, after more than three years away from management, he returned to Deportivo for a second stint, replacing the dismissed Luis César Sampedro.

Managerial statistics

References

External links

1954 births
Living people
People from Arzúa (comarca)
Sportspeople from the Province of A Coruña
Spanish footballers
Association football midfielders
Association football player-managers
Spanish football managers
La Liga managers
Segunda División managers
Segunda División B managers
Tercera División managers
Racing de Ferrol managers
CD Lugo managers
SD Compostela managers
Real Oviedo managers
RCD Mallorca managers
Real Betis managers
UD Las Palmas managers
Rayo Vallecano managers
Real Valladolid managers
RC Celta de Vigo managers
Deportivo de La Coruña managers